The Senior Courts Act 1981 (c.54), originally named the Supreme Court Act 1981, is an Act of the Parliament of the United Kingdom.

The Act prescribes the structure and jurisdictions of the Senior Courts of England and Wales (previously known as the "Superior Courts"). These Senior Courts comprise: the Court of Appeal, High Court of Justice, The Employment Appeal Tribunal, and the Crown Court.

Change of name
The Constitutional Reform Act 2005 established a new Supreme Court which, on 1 October 2009, replaced the Appellate Committee of the House of Lords.

To avoid confusion, the Supreme Court Act 1981 was renamed the Senior Courts Act 1981, and all statutory references to the Supreme Court of England and Wales were amended to refer to the Senior Courts of England and Wales.  The former term "Supreme Court" did not mean the 2009 Supreme Court (which, of course, did not exist in 1981), but was shorthand for the "Supreme Court of England and Wales", called before 1981 the "Supreme Court of Judicature", which comprised the "Superior Courts" (as opposed to the "Inferior Courts").

Section 75

The following directions have been given pursuant to section 75(1) by the Lord Chief Justice. They are titled "Classification of the business of the Crown Court and allocation to Crown Court centres":

Practice Direction [1995] 2 All ER 900, [1995] 1 WLR 1083 (26 May 1995)
Practice Direction [1998] 3 All ER 384, [1995] 1 WLR 1244, CA (30 June 1998)
Practice Direction [2000] 1 All ER 380, CA (Crim) (10 January 2000)

Section 84
This section replaced section 99 of the Supreme Court of Judicature (Consolidation) Act 1925 and section 15 of the Courts Act 1971.

References
Civil Procedure (The White Book), Thomson, Sweet & Maxwell

United Kingdom Acts of Parliament 1981
English law
Senior Courts of England and Wales
Acts of the Parliament of the United Kingdom concerning England and Wales